This is a list of female artistic gymnasts who have been on the United States national team.

The national team includes two age divisions. Only gymnasts 16 and older are eligible for the senior national team, from which Olympic and World Championship rosters are chosen. The junior national team is composed of gymnasts younger than 16. (Before 1997, the age cutoff was 14.)

USA Gymnastics, the governing body for gymnastics in the United States, generally names the teams each summer after the National Championships, but gymnasts are sometimes added to or removed from the rosters based on their performance at training camps throughout the year. Thus, some gymnasts listed under a given year were on the national team for only part of that year.  

Gymnasts on the junior national team may be moved to the senior national team midyear upon turning 16. In these cases, the gymnasts are listed in the senior national team section for that year.

Current roster

2020s

2021–22

2021

2019–21

2010s

2018–19

2017–18

2016–17

2015–16

2014–15

2013–14

2012–13

2011–12

2010–11

2000s

2009–10

2008–09

2007–08

2006–07

2005–06

2004–05

2003–04

2002–03

2001–02

2000–01

1990s

1999–2000

1998–99

1997–98

1996–97

1995–96

1994–95

1993–94

1992–93

1991–92

1990–91

1980s

1989–90

1988–89

1987–88

1986–87

1985–86

1984–85

1983–84

1982–83

References

Lists of female gymnasts